Thesium goetzeanum is a species of plant from Africa, where it grows between South Africa and Kenya.

History 
Species in the genus Thesium are poorly understood. This was particularly the case for the Thesium goetzeanum complex, which was assessed in 2018. It contained a number of morphologically similar and variable species in southern Africa. The number of species in this complex was reduced from sixteen to nine.

Thesium goetzeanum was found to have the highest number of synonyms. Five species were determined to be a synonym. These are T. coriarium A.W.Hill, T. deceptum N.E.Br, T. macrogyne A.W.Hill, T. nigrum A.W.Hill, and T. orientale A.W.Hill.

Description 
Plants start off herbacoues with virgate growth form (erect, rod-like stems) and become increasingly woody and often decumbent (branches grow along the ground but turn up towards the ends) with age. It has a rhizomatous rootstock. The leaves are linear or lance shaped and often have roughly hairy margins. Flowers are present between August and February. The bracts are mostly fused to the stalk. There is no fruit stipe.

Similar species 
Thesium goetzeanum is commonly confused with Thesium resedoides as both have similar growth forms. Thesium goetzeanum, however, has sparser branches with parallel stem (grow at about 45° in T. resedoides), vegetative shoots that grow past the inflorescences, and larger flowers.

Distribution and habitat 
This species is found growing between South Africa and Kenya. It is found in Botswana, Burundi, Eswatini, Kenya, Lesotho, Malawi, Mozambique, Rwanda, South Africa, Tanzania, Zambia, and Zimbabwe. While it prefers the grassland biome, it has also been recorded from rocky savanna areas.

Ecology 
This species occurs in the highest density in areas that have recently burned.

Etymology 
This species is named after Walter Goetze, a German naturalist, explorer and photographer who collected botanical and zoological specimens in Tanzania.

Conservation 
As this species is abundant and widespread, it is classified as least concern.

References 

Plants described in 1901
Flora of Botswana
Flora of Burundi
Flora of Swaziland
Flora of Kenya
Flora of Lesotho
Flora of Malawi
Flora of Mozambique
Flora of Rwanda
Flora of South Africa
Flora of Tanzania
Flora of Zambia
Flora of Zimbabwe
Santalaceae